Murexsul merlei is a species of sea snail, a marine gastropod mollusk in the family Muricidae, the murex snails or rock snails.

Description

Distribution
This marine species occurs off Tonga Island

References

 Houart, R.; Héros, V. (2008). Muricidae (Mollusca: Gastropoda) from Fiji and Tonga. in: Héros, V. et al. (Ed.) Tropical Deep-Sea Benthos 25. Mémoires du Muséum national d'Histoire naturelle (1993). 196: 437–480.

External links
 Houart, R.; Héros, V. (2012). New species of Muricidae (Gastropoda) and additional or noteworthy records from the western Pacific. Zoosystema. 34(1), 21-37

Muricidae
Gastropods described in 2008